The Vaasa riot took place on 4 June 1930 in Vaasa, Finland.  The riot unfolded with a violent attack by radical members of the right wing Lapua Movement on Communist supporters and bystanders at a court house in Vaasa. No intervention was witnessed of the police, as the police stood watching the attack. 

There were no fatalities or serious injuries reported. However, in the aftermath of the attack, a Finnish member of parliament was kidnapped, beaten and later released.

The Vaasa riot signalled the defeat of moderate elements in the Lapua movement which is popularly believed to stand for non-violence and rule of law. As the radicals gained control over the movement, the movement saw promotion of violence and political terror later that year.

Background
On 15 March 1930, at the second National Assembly of the Lapua movement, the moderate wing tried to curb the radicals. At the end of the assembly, The  was established, which called for opposition to communism through legal means. However, the association's activities could not contain the movement's radical followers from Ostrobothnia. 

On 28 March, a group of radical Lapua supporters destroyed the printing press in Vassa of the communist Työn Ääni magazine. Sensing no public backlash after the attacks, the radicals soon took public credit for it. Vihtori Kosola, who had not been one of the planners of the attack, but now set out to support it, became the figurehead of the movement. In the background, there was a struggle between the moderates, mainly from Helsinki, and the radicals. 

Seventy-two men stated that they had attacked the Työn Ääni office and five men took responsibility for destroying the presses. In the organ of the Lapuan movement, Activist, 650 men signed their support for the act. In a message published by Kosola, the Lapua movement proudly stated it was behind the Työn Ääni  attack.

Asser Salo,  a lawyer and Communist MP filed a lawsuit on behalf of Työn Ääni for damages against the Lapua Movement and some of its members.  The initial court date set for the trial was 7 May 7.  

The Lapua Movement announced that it would state a demonstration at the court house that day.  Esko Riekki, the head of the Detective Central Police (EK), warned the Government of Finland that the demonstration could turn violent.  The government asked Lapua to cancel the demonstration, but it refused. In response, the government asked Lapua and the Communists not to bring support forces to the court house.  To avoid creating a provocation, the government decided not to impose extra security measures.

On 7 May, when Salo arrived in Vaasa for the court hearing, a group of Lapua supporters attempted to kidnap him in the Seinäjoki train station.  In court that day, the hearing date was postposed until June 4th.

The demonstration
On the morning of 4 June, 1,800 supporters of the Lapua movement arrived in Vaasa early in the morning with cars decorated with Finnish flags. The procession of 200 cars stopped briefly at the destroyed Työn Ääni office and the governor's official residence. 

The group then stopped at a cemetery that contained graves of Lapua supporters. The men sang hymns and patriotic songs and listened to speeches that were given.

The next stop that morning was the Vaasa Court of Appeal, where the demonstration took place peacefully.  However, many followers stayed at the courthouse into the afternoon to hear the verdict on the lawsuit.

Courthouse attacks
On the afternoon of 4 June, violence broke out at the courthouse after the verdict was read. A group of Lapua supporters beat Eino Nieminen, the Työn Ääni Factor, who was invited as a witness. 

In the foyer of the second floor of the courthouse, Eino Nieminen, got into an argument with several Lapua supporters. The argument heated up and the Lapua supporter took Eino outside, tore his clothes and beat him. The crowd followed the assault from the sidelines and the police did not intervene.

Vaasa Police Chief Gunnar Tallroth eventually rescued Nieminen  and took him to the police station for safety. Soon after Nieminen left the police station, a crowd of Lapua supporters broke in and tried to find him.

The Lapua men beat up ten other leftist supporters, including Allan Asplund, a journalist for the Vaasa-based Social Democratic magazine Nya Folkbladet. Several right-wing bystanders who tried to stop the violence were also injured by the attack. 

The governor, Bruno Sarlin, came to the scene and tried to stop the violence, but was unsuccessful.

Kidnapping of Asser Salo
When Salo stepped out of the courthouse after the verdict, a group of Lapua men forcible grabbed him and whisked him into a waiting car. The EK police cold not stop the abduction. Kosti-Paavo Eerolainen, an EK detective present, later joined the radical wing of the Lapua movement. 

Salo was taken to the Lapua's youth club house, where he was threatened with execution. He was forced to swear that he would never sue Lapua again. After this, the kidnappers took Lapua to Viitasaari, where he was released.

Consequences of Vassa riot
After the riot, the Finnish Government sent in the military to patrol Vaasa.  Due to threats from Lapua, Työn Äänen did not resume publication 

The inability of the state surprised all parties. The government was shocked as the Lapua movement had already been thought to have subsided. According to Governor Sarlin, 6,000–10,000 soldiers would be needed in Vaasa to contain the crowds. The Governor also believed that he had been threatened by the communists. The left-wing and Swedish-speaking press demanded that the perpetrators be punished. However, the government sided with the Lapua movement and accused the Social Democrats and Swedes of tying up their hands in the fight against communism. It was hoped that the movement could still be curbed by concessions and anti-communist legislative initiatives.

However, the Lapuan movement had understood its own power. In Lapua, the so-called Lapua Law of June 5, 1930 was declared. In practice, the movement abandoned the authorities as the maintainer of order and declared itself above the laws and the judiciary. Vihtori Kosola met movement's representatives on June 8. In Helsinki, both the head of the Defense Forces and the head of the Finnish General Staff, while the board, headed by Kyösti Kallio, hesitated in their decisions. The control of Lapuan movement by the communists led to extreme use of violence, political terror, political pressure and influence to attain the goals of the movement.

References

1930
Rebellions in Finland
Political history of Finland
Political violence
1930 in Finland